Slai may refer to:

 Slaï (born 1973), French singer of Guadeloupe origin
 S.L.A.I.: Steel Lancer Arena International, a 2005 Mech Simulator video game
 Slai language